Jeremy Maartens (born 14 August 1979) is a South African former professional road cyclist.

Major results
2001
 1st Stage 6 FBD Milk Ras
2003
 1st  Road race, All-Africa Games
 1st  Time trial, National Road Championships
 1st Stage 3 (ITT) 
 7th Overall Giro del Capo
2004
 1st Overall Tour de Tunisie
1st Young rider classification
1st Stage 7 (ITT)
 1st Overall Tour du Maroc
 1st Stage 5 Tour of Qinghai Lake
 5th Time trial, National Road Championships
 10th Overall Giro del Capo
2007
 4th Overall Tour du Maroc

References

External links
 

1979 births
Living people
South African male cyclists
Sportspeople from Cape Town
Cyclists at the 2006 Commonwealth Games
Commonwealth Games competitors for South Africa